Tambourissa is a genus of plant in family Monimiaceae. Its range includes Madagascar, the Comoro Islands, Réunion, and Mauritius. It contains the following accepted species, according to ThePlantList.org:

 Tambourissa alaticarpa Lorence Madagascar
 Tambourissa amplifolia (Tul.) A. DC. Mauritius
 Tambourissa bathiei Cavaco Madagascar
 Tambourissa beanjadensis Lorence Madagascar
 Tambourissa bosseri Jérémie & Lorence Madagascar
 Tambourissa capuronii Cavaco Madagascar
 Tambourissa castri-delphinii Cavaco Madagascar
 Tambourissa cocottensis Lorence Mauritius
 Tambourissa comorensis Lorence Comoro Islands
 Tambourissa cordifolia Lorence Mauritius
 Tambourissa crassa Lorence Réunion
 Tambourissa decaryana Cavaco Madagascar
 Tambourissa dorrii Lorence & Jérémie Madagascar
 Tambourissa elliptica A. DC. Réunion
 Tambourissa ficus (Tul.) A. DC. Mauritius
 Tambourissa floricostata Cavaco Madagascar
 Tambourissa gracilis Perkins Madagascar
 Tambourissa hildebrandtii Perkins Madagascar
 Tambourissa humbertii Cavaco Madagascar
 Tambourissa kirkii Cavaco Comoro Islands
 Tambourissa lastelliana (Baill.) Drake Madagascar
 Tambourissa leptophylla (Tul.) A. DC. Comoro Islands, Madagascar
 Tambourissa longicarpa Lorence Madagascar
 Tambourissa madagascariensis Cavaco Madagascar
 Tambourissa mandrarensis Jérémie & Lorence Madagascar
 Tambourissa manongarivensis Lorence Madagascar
 Tambourissa masoalensis Lorence & Jérémie Madagascar
 Tambourissa moheliensis Lorence Comoro Islands
 Tambourissa nicolliae Jérémie & Lorence Madagascar
 Tambourissa nitida Danguy Madagascar
 Tambourissa nosybensis Lorence Madagascar
 Tambourissa paradoxa Perkins Comoro Islands
 Tambourissa parvifolia Baker Madagascar
 Tambourissa pedicellata Baker Mauritius
 Tambourissa peltata Baker Mauritius
 Tambourissa perrieri Drake Madagascar
 Tambourissa purpurea (Tul.) A. DC. Madagascar
 Tambourissa quadrifida Sonn. Mauritius
 Tambourissa rakotozafyi Lorence & Jérémie Madagascar
 Tambourissa religiosa A. DC. Madagascar
 Tambourissa sieberi (Tul.) A. DC. Mauritius
 Tambourissa tau Lorence Mauritius
 Tambourissa thouvenotii Danguy Madagascar
 Tambourissa trichophylla Baker Madagascar
 Tambourissa uapacifolia Cavaco Madagascar

References

Monimiaceae genera
Taxonomy articles created by Polbot
Flora of the Western Indian Ocean